1968 in the United States was marked by several major historical events. It is often considered to be one of the most turbulent and traumatic years of the 20th century in the United States.

The year began with relative peace until January 21 when the North Vietnamese Army PAVN attacked the Marine base at Khe Sanh Combat Base Quang Tri Province, Vietnam. This was the beginning of the Battle of Khe Sanh and the attack focused US command on Khe Sanh near the DMZ. The initial attack was followed by the North Vietnamese country-wide launch of the Tet Offensive on January 30, 1968, resulting in a South Vietnamese-US victory, eliminating the Viet Cong as an effective fighting force. The attack included a North Vietnamese assassination attempt on South Vietnam's president Nguyễn Văn Thiệu which failed. North Vietnam premised the attack on a South Vietnamese uprising against South Vietnam and US forces but this uprising did not occur as the South Vietnamese populace did not rally to the North. Also, on January 23 the North Korean government seized  and its crew of eighty-three in an attempt to divert attention from a failed January 21 assassination attempt on South Korean President Park Chung-hee known as the Blue House raid. In Greenland a B-52 bomber on a Cold War mission known as Operation Chrome Dome crashed with four nuclear bombs on board. One airman was killed. The cleanup operation was informally known as Operation Freezelove, a play on words on the movie Dr. Strangelove.

Four to six thousand citizens of the city of Huế, Vietnam, deemed political enemies, were either clubbed to death or buried alive by the North Vietnamese Army. This is known as the Massacre at Hue.

The year also saw the highest level of US troop commitment when President Lyndon B. Johnson signed legislation that increased the maximum number of United States troops active on the ground to five hundred and forty-nine thousand and five hundred (549,500). This did not count US forces in the South China Sea, Laos, Cambodia, Thailand, North Vietnam, and China with reserves in the Philippines, Okinawa, Japan, Korea, Guam, Hawaii, the United States, and worldwide totaling over three million (3,000,000). South Vietnam in the same year fielded a total force of eight hundred and twenty thousand troops (820,000). It was also the most expensive year of the war, with a cost of $77.4 billion. The support of the United States for South Vietnam was at its peak. Antiwar sentiment continued to grow as an increasing number of Americans questioned United States involvement in Vietnam, as the United States was drafting young men to fight for South Vietnam while South Vietnam did not have a draft for its own citizens; however, the war continued despite changing US public opinion.

North Vietnam benefited politically from the Tet Offensive when Walter Cronkite, a respected television newscaster, swayed many Americans and President Johnson, by giving his personal opinion on a national prime time editorial: "It is increasingly clear to this reporter that the only rational way out then will be to negotiate, not as victors, but as an honorable people who lived up to their pledge to defend democracy, and did the best they could." This may have marked a transition in journalism where a news reporter became a news and policy maker. President Johnson cited Walter Cronkite's changed opinion as a factor as well as Johnson's poor New Hampshire primary numbers in his decision to stop seeking reelection, stating to his advisers: "If I have lost Cronkite I have lost middle America." President Johnson later died on January 22, 1973, at age 64 from heart problems.

On April 4, civil rights activist Dr. Martin Luther King Jr. was assassinated.  The United States erupted in violent riots, the most severe of which occurred in Washington, D.C., Chicago, and Baltimore. Extensive areas of these and many other cities were looted, burned, and destroyed by the rioters and more than 40 people were killed during the month of protest, which led to greater racial tensions between Americans. Despite this, a landmark piece of legislation, the Civil Rights Act of 1968, which was President John F. Kennedy's legacy, was passed by the expertise of President Johnson in April. This legislation was passed with bipartisan Congressional support and effectively prohibited housing discrimination based on race.

The 1968 United States Presidential election became a referendum on the Vietnam War. A peace candidate had previously emerged in the Democratic Party when Senator Eugene McCarthy challenged the Vietnam War policies of President Johnson, who had refused to seek or accept another nomination for president and had endorsed his vice president, Hubert Humphrey, for the Democratic Presidential nomination. Senator McCarthy's support came primarily from young people, most of whom were subject to the draft or were in deferred status. This divided the country by age as older citizens, a so-called silent majority, tended to support or not actively oppose government policies. This division of the populace encouraged Senator Robert F. Kennedy to seek the Democratic Presidential nomination. Senator Kennedy was assassinated after winning the California primary and defeating Senator Eugene McCarthy. The assassination of Robert F. Kennedy in June led to uncertainty in the race for the Democratic nomination for the presidency. After Vice President Humphrey won the Democratic nomination at the 1968 Democratic National Convention in Chicago, another wave of violent protests emerged, this time between the mostly young antiwar demonstrators and police. The uncertainty within the Democratic Party benefited Richard Nixon, a Republican and former vice president, as he successfully won the presidential race by appealing to the "Silent Majority" under the promise "Peace with Honor". Nixon, a staunch anti-communist, had gained the voters' trust. A particularly strong showing by segregationist George Wallace of the American Independent Party in 1968's presidential election highlighted the strong element of racial division that continued to persist across the country.

In popular culture, 2001: A Space Odyssey was the most profitable film of the year, earning $56.7 million, while Oliver! won the Academy Award for Best Picture. "Hey Jude" by the Beatles was the hottest single of 1968 in the U.S. according to Billboard, demonstrating the continued popularity of bands associated with the British Invasion that began in 1964.

Incumbents

Federal Government 
 President: Lyndon B. Johnson (D-Texas)
 Vice President: Hubert Humphrey (D-Minnesota)
 Chief Justice: Earl Warren (California)
 Speaker of the House of Representatives: John William McCormack (D-Massachusetts)
 Senate Majority Leader: Mike Mansfield (D-Montana)
 Congress: 90th

Events

January
 January 2 – The Dow Jones Industrial Average is 906.4.
 January 5 – The United States indicts Benjamin Spock, famous pediatrician and author (age 65), for conspiracy to violate the draft laws. Dr. Spock was a graduate of Yale University and winner of an Olympic gold medal for rowing on the Seine River in Paris, France in 1924.
 January 6 
Dr. N.E. Shumway performs the first adult cardiac transplant operation in the U.S.
Surveyor 7, the last of the series of unmanned probes, is launched by the U.S. for soft-landing on the Moon.
 January 7 – First-class US postage is raised from 5 cents to 6 cents. US Prime rate 6%.
 January 13 – Johnny Cash records At Folsom Prison live at Folsom State Prison, California.
 January 14 – The Green Bay Packers win Super Bowl II.
 January 17 – Lyndon B. Johnson calls for the non-conversion of the U.S. dollar. 
 January 18 – The Soviet Union performs a nuclear test at Eastern Kazakh/Semipalitinsk.
 January 19 – At a White House conference on crime, singer and actress Eartha Kitt denounces the Vietnam War to Lady Bird Johnson while attending a "ladies' lunch".
 January 21
Battle of Khe Sanh in Vietnam begins.
1968 Thule Air Base B-52 crash: A U.S. B-52 Stratofortress crashes in Greenland carrying four nuclear bombs which did not explode.
 January 22 – Rowan & Martin's Laugh-In debuts on NBC. This launches the career of Goldie Hawn, who became an instant sensation.
 January 23 – North Korea seizes , claiming the ship invaded its territorial waters while spying.
 January 30 – The Viet Cong of North Vietnam launch the Tet Offensive against South Vietnam, the United States, and their allies.
 January 31 – Viet Cong soldiers attack the Embassy of the United States, Saigon. Their leaders are killed by the two United States Military Police on duty at the gate. The 101st Airborne lands on the Embassy roof and eliminates the remaining leaderless soldiers.

February

 February 1 
 Vietnam War: A Viet Cong officer named Nguyễn Văn Lém is executed by Nguyễn Ngọc Loan, a South Vietnamese National Police Chief. The event is photographed by Eddie Adams. The photo makes headlines around the world, eventually winning the 1969 Pulitzer Prize, and sways U.S. public opinion against the war.
 The Pennsylvania Railroad and the New York Central Railroad merge to form Penn Central, the largest ever corporate merger up to this date.
 February 8 – American civil rights movement: A civil rights protest staged at a white-only bowling alley in Orangeburg, South Carolina is broken up by highway patrolmen; three college students are killed.
 February 11 – Madison Square Garden in New York City opens.
 February 12 – Memphis sanitation strike: Provoked by the crushing to death of two black workers, over 1,000 black waste collectors in Memphis, Tennessee, begin a strike that lasts until April 16.
 February 13 – Civil rights disturbances occur at the University of Wisconsin–Madison and the University of North Carolina at Chapel Hill.
 February 16 – The first 9-1-1 call is made by Alabama Senator, Rankin Fite in Haleyville, Alabama.
 February 19
 The Florida Education Association (FEA) initiates a mass resignation of teachers to protest state funding of education. This is, in effect, the first statewide teachers' strike in the U.S.
 NET televises the very first episode of Mister Rogers' Neighborhood.
 February 28 – The influential American news reporter Walter Cronkite shows his disdain for the Vietnam War effort during a broadcast, which influences President Johnson not to seek another term.
 February 29 – The Kerner Commission releases its final report on the causes of the 1967 race riots.

March

 March 11 – U.S. President Lyndon B. Johnson mandates that all computers purchased by the federal government support ASCII character encoding.
 March 12 – U.S. President Lyndon B. Johnson edges out antiwar candidate Eugene J. McCarthy in the New Hampshire Democratic primary, a vote which highlights the deep divisions in the country, as well as the party, over Vietnam.
 March 14 – Nerve gas leaks from the U.S. Army Dugway Proving Ground near Skull Valley, Utah.
 March 16 
Vietnam War – My Lai massacre: American troops kill scores of civilians. The story will first become public in November 1969 and will help undermine public support for the U.S. efforts in Vietnam.
U.S. Senator Robert F. Kennedy enters the race for the Democratic Party presidential nomination.
 March 17 – A demonstration in London's Grosvenor Square against U.S. involvement in the Vietnam War leads to violence; 91 people are injured and 200 demonstrators are arrested.
 March 18 – Gold standard: The Congress of the United States repeals the requirement for a gold reserve to back U.S. currency.
 March 19–23 – Afrocentrism, Black power, Vietnam War: Students at Howard University in Washington, D.C. signal a new era of militant student activism on college campuses in the U.S. Students stage rallies, protests, and a 5-day sit-in. Students lay siege to the administration building, shut down the university in protest over its ROTC program and the Vietnam War, and demand a more Afrocentric curriculum.
 March 21 – Vietnam War:  In ongoing campus unrest, Howard University students protesting the Vietnam War, the ROTC program on campus, and the draft, confront Gen. Lewis Hershey, then head of the U.S. Selective Service System, and as he attempts to deliver an address, shouting cries of "America is the Black man's battleground!"
 March 26 – Joan Baez marries activist David Harris in New York.
 March 31 – U.S. President Lyndon B. Johnson announces he will not seek re-election in the 1968 presidential election.

April
 April 2
 The film 2001: A Space Odyssey premieres in Washington, D.C.
 In a television special broadcast on NBC, white British singer Petula Clark touches black American singer Harry Belafonte affectionately on the arm.
 April 3 
 Civil rights activist Martin Luther King Jr. delivers his "I've Been to the Mountaintop" speech at Mason Temple in Memphis, Tennessee.
 Planet of the Apes is released in theaters.
 April 4
 Martin Luther King Jr. is shot dead at the Lorraine Motel in Memphis, Tennessee. In response, riots erupt in major American cities, lasting for several days afterward.
 Apollo Program: Apollo 6 is launched, the second and last unmanned test flight of the Saturn V launch vehicle.
April 5 – Robert F. Kennedy gives a speech at the Cleveland City Club.
 April 6 
 A shootout between Black Panthers and Oakland police results in several arrests and deaths, including 17-year-old Panther Bobby Hutton.
 A double explosion in downtown Richmond, Indiana kills 41 and injures 150.
 April 10 – The 40th Academy Awards ceremony, hosted by Bob Hope, is held at Santa Monica Civic Auditorium. Norman Jewison's In the Heat of the Night wins five awards, including Best Picture, while Mike Nichols wins Best Director for The Graduate. Arthur Penn's Bonnie and Clyde and Stanley Kramer's Guess Who's Coming to Dinner both receive ten nominations each.
 April 11 – U.S. President Lyndon B. Johnson signs the Civil Rights Act of 1968.
 April 23–30 – Vietnam War: Columbia University protests of 1968 – Student protesters at Columbia University in New York City take over administration buildings and shut down the university.
 April 29 – The musical Hair officially opens on Broadway.

May
 May 14 – The Beatles announce the creation of Apple Records in a New York press conference.
 May 15 – An outbreak of severe thunderstorms produces tornadoes causing massive damage and heavy casualties in Charles City, Iowa, Oelwein, Iowa, and Jonesboro, Arkansas.
 May 17 – The Catonsville Nine enter the Selective Service offices in Catonsville, Maryland, take dozens of selective service draft records, and burn them with napalm as a protest against the Vietnam War.
 May 22 – The U.S. nuclear-powered submarine Scorpion sinks with 99 men aboard, 400 miles southwest of the Azores.

June
 June 3 – Radical feminist Valerie Solanas shoots Andy Warhol at his New York City studio, The Factory; he survives after a 5-hour operation.
 June 5 – U.S. presidential candidate Robert F. Kennedy is shot at the Ambassador Hotel in Los Angeles, California by Sirhan Sirhan. Kennedy dies from his injuries the next day.
 June 8 – James Earl Ray is arrested for the assassination of Martin Luther King Jr. in April.
 June 26 – Bonin Islands are returned to Japan after 23 years of occupation by the United States Navy.
 June 30 – The Lockheed C-5 Galaxy heavy military transport aircraft first flies in the U.S. This model will still be in service 50 years later.

July
 July 1 – The Central Intelligence Agency's Phoenix Program is officially established.
 July 15 – soap opera One Life to Live premieres on ABC television.
 July 18 – The semiconductor company Intel is founded.
 July 20 – The Special Olympics World Summer Games are held in Chicago.
 July 23–28 – Black militants led by Fred Evans engage in a fierce gunfight with police in the Glenville Shootout of Cleveland, Ohio.

August
 August 5–8 – The Republican National Convention in Miami Beach, Florida nominates Richard Nixon for U.S. president and Spiro Agnew for vice president.
 August 21 – The Medal of Honor is posthumously awarded to James Anderson Jr.; he is the first black U.S. Marine to be awarded the Medal of Honor.
 August 22–30 – Police clash with anti-war protesters in Chicago, Illinois, outside the 1968 Democratic National Convention, which nominates Hubert Humphrey for U.S. President, and Edmund Muskie for Vice President.

September
 September 7
150 women (members of New York Radical Women) arrive in Atlantic City, New Jersey to protest against the Miss America Pageant for being exploitative of women. Led by activist and author Robin Morgan, it is one of the first large demonstrations of Second Wave Feminism as Women's Liberation begins to attract media attention.
The Banana Splits Adventure Hour begins airing on NBC. It went on for two seasons, ending on December 13 a year later in the middle of Season 2.
 September 13 – Army Major General Keith L. Ware, World War II Medal of Honor recipient, is killed when his helicopter is shot down in Vietnam. He is posthumously awarded the Distinguished Service Cross.
 September 20 – Hawaii Five-O debuts on CBS, and eventually becomes the longest-running crime show in television history, until Law & Order overtakes it in 2003.
 September 24 – 60 Minutes debuts on CBS.

October
 October 1 – Night of the Living Dead premieres in the United States.
 October 2 – North Cascades National Park is established.
 October 7 – At the height of protests against the Vietnam War, José Feliciano performs "The Star-Spangled Banner" at Tiger Stadium in Detroit during Game 5 pre-game ceremonies of the 1968 World Series between the Tigers and the St. Louis Cardinals. His personalized, slow, Latin jazz performance proves highly controversial, opening the door for later interpretations of the national anthem.
 October 8 – Vietnam War – Operation Sealords: United States and South Vietnamese forces launch a new operation in the Mekong Delta.
 October 10 – 1968 World Series: The Detroit Tigers defeat the St. Louis Cardinals in the best of 7 series (4 games to 3) after being down 3 games to 1, completing an unlikely comeback against the heavily favored Cardinals led by the overpowering right-handed pitcher Bob Gibson. The final score of Game 7 is 4–1.
 October 11 – Apollo program: NASA launches Apollo 7, the first manned Apollo mission (Wally Schirra, Donn Eisele, Walter Cunningham). Mission goals include the first live television broadcast from orbit and testing the lunar module docking maneuver.
 October 14 – Vietnam War: The United States Department of Defense announces that the United States Army and United States Marines will send about 24,000 troops back to Vietnam for involuntary second tours.
 October 16 – In Mexico City, Tommie Smith and John Carlos, two black Americans competing in the Olympic 200-meter run, raise their arms in a black power salute after winning, respectively, the gold and bronze medals for 1st and 3rd place.
 October 20 – Former U.S. First Lady Jacqueline Kennedy marries Greek shipping tycoon Aristotle Onassis on the Greek island of Skorpios.
 October 25 – The Jimi Hendrix Experience releases Electric Ladyland.
 October 31 – Vietnam War: Citing progress in the Paris peace talks, U.S. President Lyndon B. Johnson announces to the nation that he has ordered a complete cessation of "all air, naval, and artillery bombardment of North Vietnam" effective November 1.

November
 November 5 
U.S. presidential election, 1968: Republican challenger Richard M. Nixon defeats the Democratic candidate, Vice President Hubert Humphrey, and American Independent Party candidate George C. Wallace.
Luis A. Ferre is elected Governor of Puerto Rico.
 November 11 – Vietnam War: Operation Commando Hunt is initiated to interdict men and supplies on the Ho Chi Minh Trail, through Laos into South Vietnam. By the end of the operation, 3 million tons of bombs are dropped on Laos, slowing but not seriously disrupting trail operations.
 November 14 – Yale University announces it is going to admit women.
 November 17 – The Heidi game: NBC cuts off the final 1:05 of an Oakland Raiders–New York Jets football game to broadcast the pre-scheduled Heidi. Fans are unable to see Oakland (which had been trailing 32–29) score 2 late touchdowns to win 43–32; as a result, thousands of outraged football fans flood the NBC switchboards to protest.
 November 20 – The Farmington Mine Disaster in Farmington, West Virginia, kills 78 men.
 November 24 – Four men hijack Pan Am Flight 281 from JFK International Airport, New York to Havana, Cuba.
 November 26 – Vietnam War: United States Air Force First Lieutenant and Bell UH-1F helicopter pilot James P. Fleming rescues an Army Special Forces unit pinned down by Viet Cong fire, earning a Medal of Honor for his bravery.

December
 December 3 – The 50-minute television special Elvis (sponsored by sewing machine manufacturer The Singer Company), taped in June with a live audience in Burbank, California, airs on NBC marking the comeback of Elvis Presley after 7 years during which the legendary rock and roll musician's career has centered on the movie industry. Concluding with the premiere of "If I Can Dream", it is not only the highest rated television show for the week of broadcast, but the highest rated television special of the year. 
 December 6 – During an airing of Rudolph The Red Nosed Reindeer, NBC renews The Banana Splits Adventure Hour for a second season.
 December 8 – NBC airs Pinocchio, starring Burl Ives and Peter Noone as part of Hallmark Hall of Fame.
 December 9 – Douglas Engelbart publicly demonstrates his pioneering hypertext system, NLS, in San Francisco.
 December 11 – The film Oliver!, based on the hit London and Broadway musical, opens in the U.S. after being released first in England. It goes on to win the Academy Award for Best Picture. The Rolling Stones Rock and Roll Circus is also filmed on this date, but not released until 1996.
 December 20 – The Zodiac Killer is believed to have shot Betty Lou Jensen and David Faraday on Lake Herman Road, Benicia, San Francisco Bay, California, his first confirmed victims.
 December 22 – David Eisenhower marries Julie Nixon, the daughter of U.S. President-elect Richard Nixon.
 December 23 – The crew of USS Pueblo are released after spending 11 months in captivity by the North Koreans.
 December 24 – Apollo Program: U.S. spacecraft Apollo 8 enters orbit around the Moon. Astronauts Frank Borman, Jim Lovell and William A. Anders become the first humans to see the far side of the Moon and planet Earth as a whole. The crew also gives a reading from the Book of Genesis.
 December 26 – Led Zeppelin make their American debut in Denver.

Undated
 Cañada College opens in Redwood City, California.
 Computers Unlimited is founded in Rochester, NY.
 In or about this year the HIV virus is thought to have first arrived in the U.S.
 United Artists pulls eleven Looney Tunes and Merrie Melodies cartoons in its library from television due to the depiction of racist stereotypes towards African-Americans. These cartoons come to be known as the Censored Eleven.

Ongoing
 Cold War (1947–1991)
 Space Race (1957–1975)
 Vietnam War, U.S. involvement (1964–1973)

Births 
 January 2 – Cuba Gooding Jr., actor
 January 4 – Mike Wilpolt, American football player and coach
 January 5 – Carrie Ann Inaba, American choreographer, game show host and singer
 January 6 – John Singleton, African American film director (died 2019)
 January 9 – Joey Lauren Adams, American actress
 January 12 – Farrah Forke, American actress (died 2022)
 January 21 – Tom Urbani, baseball player (died 2022)
 January 24 
 Colleen Doran, author and illustrator 
 Laura Leighton, actress
 January 29
 Edward Burns, actor, director, and producer
 Monte Cook, game designer and writer
 Carmelo Sigona, graffiti artist
 Aeneas Williams, American football player and pastor
 February 1 – Lisa Marie Presley, singer-songwriter (died 2023)
 February 7 – Sully Erna, singer-songwriter and guitarist 
 February 12
 Pauly Shore, comedian, actor, director, and producer
 Josh Brolin, actor 
 February 17 – Bryan Cox, American football player and coach
 February 18 – Molly Ringwald, actress
 February 19 – Prince Markie Dee, rapper (died 2021)
 February 22 
 Bradley Nowell, singer-songwriter, guitarist, and producer (died 1996)
 Jayson Williams, basketball player and sportscaster
 March 12 – Aaron Eckhart, actor
 March 23 – Mitch Cullin, author
 March 26
 Kenny Chesney, country music singer
 James Iha, alternative rock musician and co-founder of The Smashing Pumpkins; in Chicago
 April 26 – Angela Santomero, television executive producer
 May 1
Johnny Colt, bass player
D'arcy Wretzky, bass player and singer (Smashing Pumpkins)
 May 2
Eric Holcomb, 51st Governor of Indiana
Sean Taylor, writer
 May 9 – David Benoit, basketball player
 May 12
Mark Clark, baseball player and coach
Scott Schwartz, child actor
 May 22 – Tony Hawk, skateboarder
 June 2 – Jason Falkner, singer-songwriter, guitarist and producer (Jellyfish, The Grays and The Three O'Clock)
 June 4 – Joey Mazzarino, actor, puppeteer, writer and director
 June 8 – Black Rob, rapper (died 2021)
 June 14 – Campbell Brown, journalist
 June 27 – Kelly Ayotte, U.S. Senator from New Hampshire from 2011 to 2017
 July 2 – Ron Goldman, murder victim (died 1994)
 July 5 – Susan Wojcicki, CEO of YouTube
 July 7 – Allen Payne, actor
 July 16
Larry Sanger, co-founder of Wikipedia
Lynn Turner, poisoner convicted of the murder of two of her husbands (died 2010) 
 July 29 – Kristen Babb-Sprague, synchronized swimmer
 August 1 – Kenneth Bae, Korean-American Missionary
 August 9 – Gillian Anderson, actress
 August 25 – Rachael Ray, TV host
 September 4 
 John DiMaggio, voice actor
 Mike Piazza, baseball player
 September 10 – Big Daddy Kane, hip-hop artist
 September 15 – Susan Dalian, actress
 September 20 – Norah Vincent, journalist (died 2022)
 September 21 – David Jude Jolicoeur aka Trugoy the Dove, rapper and record producer (De La Soul) (died 2023)
 September 25 – Will Smith, actor, producer and rapper
 October 9 – Pete Docter, animator, film director, screenwriter, producer, voice actor, and chief creative officer of Pixar
 November 13  – Pat Hentgen, baseball player and coach
 November 18 
 Gary Sheffield, baseball player
 Owen Wilson, actor and comedian
 November 24  – Todd Beamer, passenger on board United Airlines Flight 93 (died 2001)
 December 2
 Lucy Liu, actress, voice actress, director, singer, dancer, model, and artist
 Joshua Seth, voice actor and hypnotist
 Rena Sofer, actress
 December 3 – Brendan Fraser, actor
 December 7 – Greg Ayres, voice actor
 December 8
 Michael Cole, television sports commentator
 Mike Mussina, baseball player
 December 9 – Kurt Angle, WWE superstar and Olympic wrestler
 December 16 – Tom Spurgeon, journalist, comics critic and editor (died 2019)
 December 26
 Dennis Knight, professional wrestler
 Malcolm L. McCallum, herpetologist, conservation biologist, and environmental scientist
 December 28 – Deanna Favre, activist and wife of Brett Favre
 December 29 – Tricia Leigh Fisher, actress and singer

Deaths
 January 16 – Bob Jones Sr., evangelist, religious broadcaster and founder of Bob Jones University (born 1883)
 January 19 – Ray Harroun, race car driver (born 1879)
 January 26 – Merrill C. Meigs, newspaper publisher and aviation promoter (born 1883)
 February 15 – Little Walter, blues singer, musician, and songwriter (born 1930)
 March 11 – Pearl Doles Bell, film scenarist, novelist and editor (born 1883)
 April 4 – Martin Luther King Jr., activist, clergyman and leader in the Civil Rights Movement (born 1929)
 April 16 – Edna Ferber, novelist, short story writer and playwright (born 1885)
 April 24 – Walter Tewksbury, runner and hurdler (born 1876)
 May 10 – Scotty Beckett, actor and singer (born 1929)
 May 26 – Little Willie John, African-American rock and roll, rhythm and blues singer (born 1937)
 May 28 – Corbett Davis, football fullback (born 1914)
 June 1 – Helen Keller, campaigner for the deaf and blind (born 1880)
 June 2 
 Jouett Shouse, politician (born 1879)
 R. Norris Williams, tennis player (born 1891 in Switzerland)
 June 6 – Robert F. Kennedy, younger brother of U.S. President John F. Kennedy, U.S. Senator, presidential candidate (born 1925)
 June 17 – Henrietta Bingham, journalist, newspaper executive, horse-breeder and anglophile (born 1901)
 August 18 – Arthur Marshall, ragtime composer and performer (born 1881)
 September 7 – Harold C. Train, rear admiral in World War II, Director of the Office of Naval Intelligence (born 1887)
 November 25 – Upton Sinclair, novelist (born 1878)
 December 11 – Bob Bartlett, U.S. Senator from Alaska (born 1904)
 December 20 – John Steinbeck, author (born 1902)
 December 24 – Leo Otis Colbert, admiral and engineer, Director of the United States Coast and Geodetic Survey (born 1883)

See also
List of American films of 1968
Timeline of United States history (1950–1969)

References

External links
 

 
1960s in the United States
United States
United States
Years of the 20th century in the United States